Packing problems are a class of optimization problems in mathematics that involve attempting to pack objects together into containers. The goal is to either pack a single container as densely as possible or pack all objects using as few containers as possible. Many of these problems can be related to real-life packaging, storage and transportation issues. Each packing problem has a dual covering problem, which asks how many of the same objects are required to completely cover every region of the container, where objects are allowed to overlap.

In a bin packing problem, you are given:
 A container, usually a two- or three-dimensional convex region, possibly of infinite size. Multiple containers may be given depending on the problem.
 A set of objects, some or all of which must be packed into one or more containers. The set may contain different objects with their sizes specified, or a single object of a fixed dimension that can be used repeatedly.

Usually the packing must be without overlaps between goods and other goods or the container walls. In some variants, the aim is to find the configuration that packs a single container with the maximal packing density. More commonly, the aim is to pack all the objects into as few containers as possible. In some variants the overlapping (of objects with each other and/or with the boundary of the container) is allowed but should be minimized.

Packing in infinite space
Many of these problems, when the container size is increased in all directions, become equivalent to the problem of packing objects as densely as possible in infinite Euclidean space. This problem is relevant to a number of scientific disciplines, and has received significant attention. The Kepler conjecture postulated an optimal solution for packing spheres hundreds of years before it was proven correct by Thomas Callister Hales. Many other shapes have received attention, including ellipsoids, Platonic and Archimedean solids including tetrahedra, tripods (unions of cubes along three positive axis-parallel rays), and unequal-sphere dimers.

Hexagonal packing of circles

These problems are mathematically distinct from the ideas in the circle packing theorem. The related circle packing problem deals with packing circles, possibly of different sizes, on a surface, for instance the plane or a sphere.

The counterparts of a circle in other dimensions can never be packed with complete efficiency in dimensions larger than one (in a one-dimensional universe, the circle analogue is just two points). That is, there will always be unused space if you are only packing circles. The most efficient way of packing circles, hexagonal packing, produces approximately 91% efficiency.

Sphere packings in higher dimensions

In three dimensions, close-packed structures offer the best lattice packing of spheres, and is believed to be the optimal of all packings. With 'simple' sphere packings in three dimensions ('simple' being carefully defined) there are nine possible definable packings. The 8-dimensional E8 lattice and 24-dimensional Leech lattice have also been proven to be optimal in their respective real dimensional space.

Packings of Platonic solids in three dimensions
Cubes can easily be arranged to fill three-dimensional space completely, the most natural packing being the cubic honeycomb. No other Platonic solid can tile space on its own, but some preliminary results are known. Tetrahedra can achieve a packing of at least 85%. One of the best packings of regular dodecahedra is based on the aforementioned face-centered cubic (FCC) lattice.

Tetrahedra and octahedra together can fill all of space in an arrangement known as the tetrahedral-octahedral honeycomb.

Simulations combining local improvement methods with random packings suggest that the lattice packings for icosahedra, dodecahedra, and octahedra are optimal in the broader class of all packings.

Packing in 3-dimensional containers

Different cuboids into a cuboid 
Determine the minimum number of cuboid containers (bins) that are required to pack a given set of item cuboids. The rectangular cuboids to be packed can be rotated by 90 degrees on each axis.

Spheres into a Euclidean ball

The problem of finding the smallest ball such that  disjoint open unit balls may be packed inside it has a simple and complete answer in -dimensional Euclidean space if , and in an infinite-dimensional Hilbert space with no restrictions. It is worth describing in detail here, to give a flavor of the general problem. In this case, a configuration of  pairwise tangent unit balls is available. Place the centers at the vertices  of a regular  dimensional simplex with edge 2; this is easily realized starting from an orthonormal basis. Moreover, any other point of the space necessarily has a larger distance from at least one of the  vertices.

To show that this configuration is optimal, let  be the centers of  disjoint open unit balls contained in a ball of radius  centered at a point . Consider the map from the finite set  into  taking  in the corresponding  for each . Since for all ,  this map is 1-Lipschitz and by the Kirszbraun theorem it extends to a 1-Lipschitz map that is globally defined; in particular, there exists a point  such that for all  one has , so that also . This shows that there are  disjoint unit open balls in a ball of radius  if and only if . Notice that in an infinite-dimensional Hilbert space this implies that there are infinitely many disjoint open unit balls inside a ball of radius  if and only if .

Spheres in a cuboid

Determine the number of spherical objects of given diameter  that can be packed into a cuboid of size .

Identical spheres in a cylinder

Determine the minimum height  of a cylinder with given radius  that will pack  identical spheres of radius . For a small radius  the spheres arrange to ordered structures, called columnar structures.

Polyhedra in spheres
Determine the minimum radius  that will pack  identical, unit volume polyhedra of a given shape.

Packing in 2-dimensional containers
Many variants of 2-dimensional packing problems have been studied. See the linked pages for more information.

Packing of circles 

You are given  unit circles, and have to pack them in the smallest possible container. Several kinds of containers have been studied:

 Packing circles in a circle - closely related to spreading points in a unit circle with the objective of finding the greatest minimal separation, between points.
 Packing circles in a square - closely related to spreading points in a unit square with the objective of finding the greatest minimal separation, between points. To convert between these two formulations of the problem, the square side for unit circles will be .

Packing of squares 
You are given  unit squares and have to pack them into the smallest possible container, where the container type varies:

The wasted space is asymptotically .

Packing of rectangles

 Packing identical rectangles in a rectangle: The problem of packing multiple instances of a single rectangle of size , allowing for 90° rotation, in a bigger rectangle of size  has some applications such as loading of boxes on pallets and, specifically, woodpulp stowage. For example, it is possible to pack 147 rectangles of size (137,95) in a rectangle of size (1600,1230).
 Packing different rectangles in a rectangle: The problem of packing multiple rectangles of varying widths and heights in an enclosing rectangle of minimum area (but with no boundaries on the enclosing rectangle's width or height) has an important application in combining images into a single larger image. A web page that loads a single larger image often renders faster in the browser than the same page loading multiple small images, due to the overhead involved in requesting each image from the web server. The problem is NP-complete in general, but there are fast algorithms for solving small instances.

Related fields
In tiling or tessellation problems, there are to be no gaps, nor overlaps. Many of the puzzles of this type involve packing rectangles or polyominoes into a larger rectangle or other square-like shape.

There are significant theorems on tiling rectangles (and cuboids) in rectangles (cuboids) with no gaps or overlaps:
An a × b rectangle can be packed with 1 × n strips if and only if n divides a or n divides b.
de Bruijn's theorem: A box can be packed with a harmonic brick a × a b × a b c if the box has dimensions a p × a b q × a b c r for some natural numbers p, q, r (i.e., the box is a multiple of the brick.)

The study of polyomino tilings largely concerns two classes of problems: to tile a rectangle with congruent tiles, and to pack one of each n-omino into a rectangle.

A classic puzzle of the second kind is to arrange all twelve pentominoes into rectangles sized 3×20, 4×15, 5×12 or 6×10.

Packing of irregular objects
Packing of irregular objects is a problem not lending itself well to closed form solutions; however, the applicability to practical environmental science is quite important. For example, irregularly shaped soil particles pack differently as the sizes and shapes vary, leading to important outcomes for plant species to adapt root formations and to allow water movement in the soil.

The problem of deciding whether a given set of polygons can fit in a given square container has been shown to be complete for the existential theory of the reals.

See also
 Set packing
 Bin packing problem
 Slothouber–Graatsma puzzle
 Conway puzzle
 Tetris
 Covering problem
 Knapsack problem
 Tetrahedron packing
 Ellipsoid packing
 Cutting stock problem
 Kissing number problem
 Close-packing of equal spheres
 Random close pack
 Strip packing problem

Notes

References

External links

 Optimizing Three-Dimensional Bin Packing
 API for 3D bin packing
 3D Boxes and Cylinders packing with telescoping
Many puzzle books as well as mathematical journals contain articles on packing problems.
 Links to various MathWorld articles on packing
 MathWorld notes on packing squares.
 Erich's Packing Center
 www.packomania.com A site with tables, graphs, calculators, references, etc.
 "Box Packing" by Ed Pegg, Jr., the Wolfram Demonstrations Project, 2007.
 Best known packings of equal circles in a circle, up to 1100

 Circle packing challenge problem in Python